Blokhin Peak, is a mountain in the Anyuy Range. Administratively it is part of the Chukotka Autonomous Okrug, Russian Federation.

It is located a short distance further to the NNE of Pik Sovetskoy Gvardii, the second-highest peak.

See also
List of mountains in Russia

References

External links
Спортивный туризм на Чукотке в 1970–х (Sports tourism in Chukotka in the 1970s)

Mountains of Chukotka Autonomous Okrug